Rapid Fire Romance is a 1926 American silent action film directed by Harry Joe Brown and starring Billy Sullivan, Marjorie Bonner and Harry Buckley.

Cast
 Billy Sullivan as Tommy Oliver 
 Marjorie Bonner as Dixie Demnman 
 Harry Buckley as Satin Fingers 
 John Sinclair as 'Breezy' Denman

References

Bibliography
 James Robert Parish & Michael R. Pitts. Film directors: a guide to their American films. Scarecrow Press, 1974.

External links

1926 films
1920s action films
American action films
Films directed by Harry Joe Brown
American silent feature films
Rayart Pictures films
American black-and-white films
1920s English-language films
1920s American films